Tis is a municipality and village in Havlíčkův Brod District in the Vysočina Region of the Czech Republic. It has about 400 inhabitants.

Administrative parts
The village of Kněž is an administrative part of Tis.

References

Villages in Havlíčkův Brod District